Vanderpool is a small unincorporated community in Bandera County in the Texas Hill Country, which is part of the Edwards Plateau. It is considered part of the San Antonio Metropolitan Statistical Area. Although it is unincorporated, Vanderpool has a post office, with the ZIP code of 78885. According to the Handbook of Texas, Vanderpool had a population of 22 in 1990. Hunting, ranching and tourism are prime contributors to the regional economy.

History
On August 18, 1849, José Texaso was given a land grant by the Republic of Texas, which then was patented by his assignee, John W. Smith. Later, Smith sold it to Victor Prosper Considerant, who in turn sold it to Gideon W. Thompson and Henry Taylor. Taylor eventually owned several thousand acres of the community and sold them for the construction of churches and a cemetery. Its location within the Sabinal Valley was first settled in the 1850s but was briefly a ghost town after a Comanche Indian tribe raided the area in the 1860s. The last Indian raid recorded in the community was in 1881. Other Native American tribes living in the area were Apaches, Tonkawas, and Kickapoos; the Apaches had established villages in the area.

A post office was established at Vanderpool in 1886 and remained in operation until 1889, but then reopened in 1902. The town, previously known as Bugscuffle, is named after the first postmaster, L.B. Vanderpool. The community had one business and 22 residents in 1990, which went down to 20 in 2000. 
Bell Ranch, which later changed its name to Rancho Las Campanas, was fenced and stocked with exotics.

The Upper Sabinal Missionary Baptist Church of Christ was organized sometime before 1888 and had 40 members until disbanding in 1947. Catholics of Vanderpool was organized in 1975 and had 14 families as part of its membership in 1989. An Apostolic Christian Church held services in the community center in the 1980s and was organized in 1923. Evangelical Christian camp Young Life operates Camp Lonehollow.

Geography
Vanderpool, known today as the "Crossroads of Western Bandera County", is located along the Sabinal River in the Sabinal Canyon.

Climate
The climate in this area is characterized by hot, humid summers and generally mild to cool winters. According to the Köppen Climate Classification system, Vanderpool has a humid subtropical climate, abbreviated "Cfa" on climate maps.

Education
Schools were built on the land grant sold by John W. Smith. Bugscuffle School was established in the area and had 53 students and one teacher in the 1887-1888 school year. It became an elementary school and served 36 students in 1923. It remained in operation until 1942.

The Utopia Independent School District serves students in the area.

Attractions
Vanderpool is home to the Lone Star Motorcycle Museum, which features over 50 classic motorcycles from 1910 to the modern era. Lost Maples State Park is located a few miles north of town. Garner State Park, in which the Green kingfisher can be spotted, is about a 30-minute drive to the southwest. It is a popular birdwatching destination  for American and foreign tourists.

References

Unincorporated communities in Bandera County, Texas
Greater San Antonio
Unincorporated communities in Texas